Vincenzo Florio Jr. (18 March 1883 – 6 January 1959) was an Italian entrepreneur, heir of the rich Florio entrepreneurial dynasty, one of the wealthiest Italian families during the late 19th century. An automobile enthusiast, he is best known as the founder of the Targa Florio.

Early life
He was the son of the Senator of the Kingdom of Italy, Ignazio Florio Sr. and baroness Giovanna D'Ondes Trigona. He was born in Palermo and was named after his grandfather Vincenzo Florio Sr. (1799–1886) who founded the Florio wine and spice company. He was the younger brother of Ignazio Florio Jr. Not inclined to business, he loved traveling and was a frequent visitor of Paris, Nice, Montecarlo and Cannes. Luxury boats were one of his passions: in the family they owned five yachts. In 1909 he married principessa Annina Alliata di Montereale. After her death to cholera in 1911, he married Lucie Henry of Épernay, France, a year later. He died without issue.

Career

An automobile enthusiast, he initiated the financial basis and the engineering plans for the "Brescia Motor Week" in Brescia, Lombardy. He had finished third in the 1904 edition, and generously funding the 1905 race, which was renamed Coppa Florio. He donated 50,000 lire and a Cup for the winner.  His greatest fame came from creating the Targa Florio race in 1906, based on discussions with James Gordon Bennett Jr. and Henri Desgrange. The Targa also claimed to be a worldly event not to be missed. Renowned artists, such as Alexandre Charpentier and Leonardo Bistolfi, were commissioned to design medals. A magazine was initiated, Rapiditas, which aimed to enhance, with graphic and photographic reproductions of the race, the myth of the car and the typical character of modern life, speed.

Florio also raced himself. His best result was the win in the Targa Rignano (Padova - Bovolenta) 1903, named after Count Rignano, thus inspiring Florio to pick the surname-based Targa Florio.  His own racing team, however, got Felice Nazzaro to leave Fiat and join as driver, who had won the 1907 race. In 1913 Vincenzo Florio founded the Automobile Club of Sicily, of which he remained president for a long time.

Death
He died at Épernay, France. He is buried in the family chapel, in the cemetery of Santa Maria di Gesù.

Commemoration
Florio was also a painter. The exhibition Vincenzo Florio – A taste for modernity was on display in Palermo in 2003.

References

1883 births
1959 deaths
Businesspeople from Palermo
Italian motorsport people
Italian racing drivers
Auto racing executives
Vincenzo
Targa Florio
Sportspeople from Palermo